"Fear (Of the Unknown)" is the twenty-fourth episode and the season finale of the tenth season of the American television medical drama Grey's Anatomy, and is the 220th episode overall. It aired on May 15, 2014 on ABC in the United States. The episode was written by Shonda Rhimes and William Harper and directed by Tony Phelan. On its initial airing, it was watched by 8.92 million viewers. The episode marked the departure of one of the lead characters, Cristina Yang, played by Sandra Oh since the inception of the series. The episode focuses on Yang as she prepares to say her goodbyes to the doctors at Grey-Sloan Memorial hospital, including her "person" Meredith Grey (Ellen Pompeo), her long-time friend and Meredith's husband Derek Shepherd (Patrick Dempsey) and her love-interest Owen Hunt (Kevin McKidd) and leave for Zurich for her new job at the Klausman Institute for Medical Research. The episode received widespread critical acclaim with high praise directed towards Oh's performance.

Amidst Yang's departure a catastrophe occurs at a nearby mall bringing loads of patients to Grey-Sloan. Derek asks Meredith to move to D.C. with her for his new job. Callie Torres (Sara Ramirez) and Arizona Robbins (Jessica Capshaw) consider having a surrogate mother carry their child while April Kepner (Sarah Drew) is nervous about raising her own child with Jackson Avery (Jesse Williams). Miranda Bailey (Chandra Wilson) is nominated for a position at the Hospital Board to replace Cristina, who instead left the seat for Alex Karev (Justin Chambers). Also, Leah Murphy (Tessa Ferrer) is fired from her job, Shane Ross (Gaius Charles) quits his residency at Grey-Sloan to accompany Yang to Zurich as her student and Richard Webber (James Pickens Jr.) meets with Maggie Pierce (Kelly McCreary), and finds out that her birth mother was Ellis Grey (Kate Burton).

This episode marks the final appearance of Sandra Oh as Cristina Yang and Gaius Charles as Shane Ross. It is also the final appearance of Tessa Ferrer as Leah Murphy as a series-regular.

Plot

The day has arrived that Cristina leaves for Zurich, but a possible act of terrorism delays her departure. Cristina needed to run to the mall, Derek was passing around D.C. brochures, and Alex was looking to buy a fancy car with all his new money. The foundation was cutting funding and Bailey’s genome lab was going to be shut down.  Before Yang could get to the mall to buy a European phone charger, an explosion at the mall sends multiple injured victims to the Grey Sloan Memorial Hospital. Leah comes to the ER when she hears about the explosion, but leaves with no goodbyes when she sees every patient had been treated.

April told Hunt that she was pregnant, a happy announcement that was interrupted by some not-so-happy news. April receives a pep talk from Catherine Avery, her mother-in-law, when she starts to fear raising a baby in a world that is so dangerous. With all hands on deck, the hospital turned into a zoo filled with decontamination zones, and thankfully, one Cristina Yang. She hadn’t had time to get to the mall, so instead, she came in to lend a hand, as did Leah. Cristina, looking for closure, can’t leave the hospital until she and Meredith dance it out one last time. Shane demands that he take control of his education and leaves to work under Cristina in Zurich.

In surgery, Cristina asked Alex if he really wanted to go the private practice route. She told him he had good hands, he thinks fast, and he acts faster. With only two hours until her flight, Cristina was scrubbing in to do Link’s heart transplant surgery, but Meredith told her it was time to go. Cristina found Bailey and Webber they both had to say goodbye to Yang, but not before Shane got a word in. He asked Yang to take him with her to Switzerland. He was in charge of his education and he chose Yang. She was who he wanted to learn from, and she agreed. Cristina told Meredith to wait for her, and she ran to the OR where Owen was operating. Cristina knocked on the gallery glass, and when he looked up, she waved.

Outside, Link’s heart arrived in a cab that Meredith shoved Cristina into. She told her to go now or she never would. What did she need, an I love you? Just like that, Meredith told her she loved her and to call her when she got there. Back on the walkway of amazing moments and even more amazing scenery, Amelia was telling Meredith that she could go to D.C. if she wanted because Amy was good here. However, that thought had to be put on hold when Cristina came sweeping through, grabbed Mer and pulled her into an on-call room. She couldn’t go, not before they danced it out. As Meredith found a song, Cristina told her to call at least twice a month and to text all the time, told her to take care of Owen and keep him from getting all dark and twisty, to take care of Alex, which meant mocking him at least once a day to keep him from becoming insufferable. Oh, and “Don’t get on little tiny planes that can crash, or stick your hand in a body cavity that has a bomb in it, or offer your life to a gunman. Don’t do that. Don’t be a hero. You’re my person. I need you alive. You make me brave.” and they dance it out.

Meredith tells Derek that she can’t leave Seattle, the place where she grew up and made her life; she’s not going to Washington, D.C., despite what Derek says. Callie and Arizona consider having a surrogate mother carry their future baby after treating a surrogate who was burned by the explosion. Bailey is nominated for a position on the board by Webber due to Cristina’s departure; however, Cristina left Karev her shares of the hospital and her board position. Webber connects with Dr. Pierce, the new head of cardio, and finds out that her birth mother was Ellis Grey.

Production

Sandra Oh declared that she would be leaving after Season 10 and stated, "It’s been a great privilege to play the character of Cristina Yang on GA and I am both sad and excited to see where this, her final season will take her," Oh said in her statement. "It was an emotional and deeply creative decision for me and I feel fully supported by Shonda Rhimes and the writers. It’s so rare in an actor’s life to be able to explore and grow a character so fully, so completely. I am profoundly grateful to everyone at GA for the opportunity."

Creator Shonda Rhimes added. "Over the past 10 seasons, I have been made better by Sandra’s trust, faith and friendship and I can’t quantify how grateful I am for her collaboration on a character we both love so deeply.  This year is going to be bittersweet for us – we’re both going to savor every moment of Cristina Yang and then we’re going to give her the exit she deserves. And when Sandra walks out of my door, Grey’s Anatomy will be once again be forever changed."

Oh told The Hollywood Reporter, which first announced the news. "It’s such an interesting thing to play a character for so long and to actually get the sense that she wants to be let go as well. [Cristina] wants to be let go, and I am ready to let her go." and added, "Creatively, I really feel like I gave it my all, and I feel ready to let her go,"

Co-Star Kevin McKidd on Oh's exit said, "Pain is sometimes close to pleasure, and there's a lot of pain here," to The Hollywood Reporter, "But there will be pleasure again to explore that."

Ellen Pompeo who plays Oh's on-screen best-friend and the show's protagonist Meredith Grey tweeted, "So proud of the work we've done together @iamsandraoh," along with a picture of her and Oh in their Grey's scrubs to pay tribute to the character "We've laughed, we cried, we've kicked some serious acting ass together #SOGRATEFUL."

On April 24, Oh filmed her final scene on Grey's Anatomy, and took to social media to reflect on her last day of filming. "Starting the last day of shooting on Grey's with my usual mug of tea," she captioned a photo of a Grey's mug. "A little meditation and much gratitude."

Reception

Broadcast
The episode was originally broadcast on May 15, 2014 in the United States on the American Broadcasting Company(ABC), and it was watched by 8.92 million viewers.  In the key 18-49 demographic, the episode was ranked 10th and 20th in overall viewership rank and was the 4th most watched drama. The episode scored a 2.6/8 in Nielsen ratings.

Reviews

The episode received widespread critical acclaim, with critics particularly praising Oh's performance and the send-off for her character.

The A.V. Club called the finale "emotional" and wrote, "The finale was an odd combination half-giant explosion, half-sentimental goodbye to a legendary television character. Some of these parts worked out better than other parts, but compared to previous seasons, this finale was much more emotional." stating that, "the show’s emotional relationships can resonate strongly enough to bypass soapiness."

Wetpaint wrote, "Distance from her 'persona' aside, it does seem like Cristina got her happily-ever-after now that she's in her dream job in Zurich, beholden only to her work"

TV Fanatic lauded the episode stating, "There were so many instances where I couldn't help but to shed a tear or two", and added "Overall, 'Fear (Of the Unknown)' was a moving, stressful and emotional rollercoaster that illustrated Cristina's happy ending in such a seamless way. It was really the best way to say goodbye to Yang, and I'm sad she's gone, but am now excited and curious to see how the show will go on without her."

Entertainment Weekly also praised the send-off for Cristina writing, "I loved how they sent her off. It was to-the-point, she and Meredith danced it out, and it wasn’t made into too big a deal because it’s not as if she died. Then again, if this is the last we’re going to see of her, I felt it should’ve been more central to the episode, right?" The site added, "Can we talk about how perfect that speech was? I loved the many throwbacks, particularly the one to Cristina’s “don’t be a hero” speech to Burke during season 2’s bomb episodes. This was the Twisted Sisters' goodbye I wanted." and also praised the exit for Tessa Ferrer's character saying, "Leah too got a nice exit, walking out of the hospital to find what she’s good at"

Many sources, including Rachel Simon of Bustle and Nicole Pomarico of Wetpaint, claimed that Oh's performance during her tenth and final season on Grey's Anatomy is worthy of an Emmy nomination. Simon stated "She made us care about Grey’s in a way we hadn’t in years, bringing us into Cristina’s life and mind fully and ferociously. The show has been good for several seasons now; because of Oh’s performance this year, it once again became great."

References

Grey's Anatomy (season 10) episodes
2013 American television episodes